King Louis  may refer to:

Kings
 Louis I (disambiguation), multiple kings with the name
 Louis II (disambiguation), multiple kings with the name
 Louis III (disambiguation), multiple kings with the name
 Louis IV (disambiguation), multiple kings with the name
 Louis V (disambiguation), multiple kings with the name
 Louis VI of France (died 1137), called Louis the Fat
 Louis VII of France (died 1180), called Louis the Younger
 Louis VIII of France (died 1226), called Louis the Lion
 Louis IX of France (died 1270), called Saint Louis
 Louis X of France (died 1316), called Louis the Quarreller
 Louis XI of France (died 1483), called Louis the Prudent
 Louis XII of France (died 1515)
 Louis XIII of France (died 1643), called Louis the Just
 Louis XIV of France, the 'Sun King'
 Louis XV of France (died 1774), called the Louis the Beloved
 Louis XVI of France (died in 1792) executed in the revolution 
 Louis XVII of France (died 1795), died in prison, never anointed as king
 Louis XVIII of France (died 1824),
 Louis XIX of France (died 1844), nominally king for less than an hour
 Louis-Philippe of France 
 Louis Alphonse, Duke of Anjou claims to be "Louis XX, King of France and Navarre"

"King Louie"
 King Louie, animated film character 
 King Louie Bankston, rock musician, better known as King Louie
 King Louie (rapper)

Other
 King Louis, drummer for Jesse Quin & The Mets